Eudonia magna is a moth in the family Crambidae. It was described by Wei-Chun Li, Hou-Hun Li and Matthias Nuss in 2012. It is found in China (Gansu, Henan, Hubei, Ningxia, Shaanxi, Sichuan, Tibet, Yunnan, Zhejiang).

The length of the forewings is 7–9 mm. The forewings are covered with blackish-brown scales. The antemedian, postmedian and subterminal lines are white. The hindwings are white.

Etymology
The species name refers to the large gnathos in the male genitalia and is derived from Latin magnus (meaning large).

References

Moths described in 2012
Eudonia